The Cloverdale Historic District is a  historic district in Montgomery, Alabama.  It is roughly bounded by Norman Bridge and Cloverdale roads, Fairview and Felder avenues, and Boultier Street. It contains 463 contributing buildings and 4 structures that date from the mid-19th to the early 20th centuries.  The district was placed on the National Register of Historic Places on September 12, 1985.

References

National Register of Historic Places in Montgomery, Alabama
Historic districts in Montgomery, Alabama
Victorian architecture in Alabama
Historic districts on the National Register of Historic Places in Alabama